MQZ may refer to:
The ISO 639 code for the Malasanga language
The IATA code for Margaret River Airport